Deutsche Flugzeug-Werke, usually known as DFW, was a German aircraft manufacturer of the early twentieth century. It was established by Bernhard Meyer and Erich Thiele at Lindenthal in 1910, and initially produced Farman designs under licence, later moving on to the Etrich Taube and eventually to its own designs. One of these, the DFW C.V reconnaissance aircraft, was produced to the extent of several thousand machines, including licence production by other firms. Plans to develop civil aircraft after the war proved fruitless, and the company was bought by ATG shortly thereafter.

Aircraft
 DFW Mars
 DFW B.I
 DFW C.I
 DFW C.III
 DFW C.V
 DFW D.I
 DFW D.II
 DFW R.I
 DFW R.II
 DFW R.III
 DFW T.28 Floh

References

 

Defunct aircraft manufacturers of Germany